My Gun Is Quick (1950) is Mickey Spillane's second novel featuring private investigator Mike Hammer. It was the basis for the 1957 film of the same name.

Plot summary
The story starts with Mike Hammer meeting a red-headed prostitute in a diner.  She is hassled by a man she appears to know and fear but Mike deals with him swiftly. Despite little conversation, he gives her some money to get a real job and leaves.  The next day she is found dead, the victim of an apparent hit-and-run accident.  Mike does not believe this and proceeds to hunt down her murderers.  In the process he uncovers a massive and powerful prostitution ring in New York.

1950 American novels
Novels by Mickey Spillane
Novels about American prostitution
Novels set in New York City
E. P. Dutton books
American novels adapted into films
Mike Hammer (character) novels